Juana Inés, is a Mexican television series co-produced by Canal Once and Bravo Films. The series is created by Patricia Arriaga Jordán, based on the life and work of Sor Juana Inés de la Cruz. The series consists of seven episodes and one season. Series production began on November 4, 2015 in the Ex-Hacienda Santa Mónica, in Mexico City.  The series was released on 26 March 2016.

The series stars Arcelia Ramírez as Sor Juana Inés de la Cruz and Arantza Ruiz as Young Juana Inés.

Plot 
The story is based on the life of Sor Juana Inés de la Cruz as she travels from her uncle's home to the court of the viceroy of New Spain to a convent run by Carmelite Nuns. It shows Juana's struggles as she tries to find a safe haven in order to pursue her intellectual development as a woman with a damaging past. She faces harsh opposition from the leaders of the Catholic Church and the Spanish Inquisition who are horrified by Juana's intelligence and her desire for knowledge as a woman. The story tries to explain some of the mystery surrounding the life of Sor Juana Inés de la Cruz: her uncertain relationship with the church hierarchy, the nature of her affections, and the reason for her sudden, seemingly self-imposed silence.

Context 
Juana Inés is one of few fiction pieces based on the life of the iconic Mexican poet - and the only TV series. María Luisa Bemberg made a movie in 1990 called I, the Worst of All based on the book "The traps of faith" by Nobel Prize Winner Octavio Paz.

Cast 
 Arcelia Ramírez as Sor Juana Inés de la Cruz
 Arantza Ruiz as Young Juana Inés
 Hernán del Riego as Padre Antonio Núñez de Miranda
 Margarita Sanz as Sor María
 Lisa Owen as Vicereine Leonor Carreto de Toledo
 Yolanda Corrales as Vicereine María Luisa Manrique de Lara
 Carlos Valencia as Archbishop Francisco de Aguiar y Seijas
 Mauricio Isaac as Virrey Antonio Sebastián de Toledo y Salazar, Marqués de Mancera
 Pedro de Tavira Egurrola as Carlos de Sigüenza y Góngora
 Emilio Savinni as Virrey Tomás Antonio de la Cerda y Aragón, Marqués de la Laguna
 Néstor Galván as Obispo Manuel Fernández de Santa Cruz
 Paulina Matos as María Luisa de Toledo y Carreto
 Alberto Collado as Ignacio Lizárraga
 Rocío García as Josefa López
 Luis Maya as Padre Carlos
 Clementina Guadarrama as Malinalli

Soundtrack 
Juana Ines's last episode's end credits list the following songs as its soundtrack:

 String Quartet No. 1 (Michael Nyman) from "Chamber of Music Volume 2", played by the Balanescu Quartet. (Courtesy of MN Records, 2012)
 Alexander Balanescu and Jonathan Carney playing the violin, Kate Musker playing the viola, and Anthony Hinningan playing the cello.
 String Quartet No. 2 (Michael Nyman) from "Chamber of Music Volume 2", played by the Balanescu Quartet. (Courtesy of MN Records, 2012)
 Alexander Balanescu and Jonathan Carney playing the violin, Kate Musker playing the viola, and Anthony Hinningan playing the cello.
 Trysting Fields (Michael Nyman) from "Mozart 252", played by the Michael Nyman Band (Courtesy of MN Records, 2008)
 Conducted by Michael Nyman.
 Gaudete Cum Maria (Eugenia Ramirez) in Suavidad Al Aire from "Cantatas y Arias Del Mexico Virreinal", played by Camerata Aguascalientes. (Courtesy of Quindecim Recordings)
 Directed by Horacio Franco, with Eugenia Ramirez as a soprano.
 Amplius Lava Me (Eugenia Ramirez) in Suavidad Al Aire from "Cantatas y Arias Del Mexico Virreinal", played by Camerata Aguascalientes. (Courtesy of Quindecim Recordings)
 Directed by Horacio Franco, with Eugenia Ramirez as a soprano.
 A La Misma Señora  (Written by Sor Juana Ines de la Cruz in honor of the Countess of Galve's birthday)
 Composed by Margarita Sanz, interpreted by Margarita Sanz and Arcelia Ramirez.

Another song has gone unlisted in the end credits. Quae Est Ista, in Suavidad Al Aire from "Cantatas y Arias Del Mexico Virreinal", is another song by Eugenia Ramirez that can clearly be heard during the triumphal arch scene in the fourth episode of the series. The reason as to why it is seemingly absent from the end credits is not known.

Episodes 
The series was acquired by Netflix, was released on January 27, 2017 in France.

Awards and nominations

References

External links 
 

2010s Mexican television series
2016 Mexican television series debuts
2016 Mexican television series endings